Needmore is an unincorporated community in Scott County, in the U.S. state of Arkansas.

History
According to tradition, the community was so named because the local country store "needed more" of everything.

References

Unincorporated communities in Arkansas
Unincorporated communities in Scott County, Arkansas